A Quaibrücke, or Quai-Brücke, or Quai Brücke (German, from ) is a German term for quay bridge. Commonly used in German language and is sometimes even used as a name of such bridges in some places:

Switzerland:
Quaibrücke in Zurich.
Alternative name for Seebrücke bridge in Lucerne.